"Finest Worksong" is the third and final single released from R.E.M.'s fifth studio album Document. It peaked at number 50 on the UK Singles Chart in April 1988, at the time the group's highest-charting single in the UK.

The single version of the song (also known as Mutual Drum Horn mix), featuring a new horn section by The Uptown Horns, was placed on R.E.M.'s I.R.S. Records compilation Eponymous. This was the last original single the band released on I.R.S. Records.

Track listing
All songs written by Bill Berry, Peter Buck, Mike Mills and Michael Stipe.

7" single
 "Finest Worksong" – 3:50
 "Time After Time, Etc." (Live)1 – 8:22

12" single and 3" CD single
 "Finest Worksong" – 3:50
 "Time After Time, Etc." (Live)1 – 8:22
 "Finest Worksong" (Lengthy Club mix) – 5:52
 "Finest Worksong" (Other mix) – 3:47

UK CD single
 "Finest Worksong"
 "Time After Time, Etc." (Live)1
 "It's the End of the World as We Know It (And I Feel Fine)"

Notes
1 Recorded at the Muziekcentrum Vredenburg, Utrecht, Netherlands; September 14, 1987, this live medley included "Time After Time (AnnElise)", a snippet of Peter Gabriel's "Red Rain" and "So. Central Rain (I'm Sorry)"

Charts

References

External links
Video Clip at REMhq.com

1987 songs
1988 singles
American heavy metal songs
Funk metal songs
I.R.S. Records singles
R.E.M. songs
Song recordings produced by Scott Litt
Song recordings produced by Michael Stipe
Song recordings produced by Mike Mills
Song recordings produced by Bill Berry
Song recordings produced by Peter Buck
Songs written by Bill Berry
Songs written by Peter Buck
Songs written by Mike Mills
Songs written by Michael Stipe